Complete Best may refer to:

 Complete Best (Celine Dion album), 2008
 Complete Best (Sweetbox album), 2007
Complete Best, Day After Tomorrow album
 Perfume: Complete Best, 2006